The Croatian State Government was the government of the Independent State of Croatia from 16 April 1941 until 8 May 1945.

On 11 April 1941, after the proclamation of the Independent State of Croatia, Slavko Kvaternik, Deputy Leader of the Ustaše issued an order in which all state questions would be dealt with by the Ban Government Department (Odjel Banske vlasti). One day later, he formed an interim government called the Croatian State Leadership. Kvaternik appointed the members of the Croatian State Leadership until Pavelić formed the government. The chairman of the interim government was Mile Budak, other members were Mirko Puk (Deputy Leader), Andrija Artuković, Branko Benzon, Jozo Dumandžić, Mladen Lorković, Ismet Muftić, Marko Veršić, Đuro Vranešić and Milovan Žanić.

Ante Pavelić arrived in Zagreb on 15 April 1941. He formally established the government the following day by declaring the Provision for the Appointment of the Croatian State Government, which he signed as Poglavnik of the Independent State of Croatia. By this Provision, Pavelić inaugurated the official name of the state and his function in it.

According to this provision, the State Government was the supreme state body that performed state administration. The State Government was responsible to the Poglavnik, who appointed members of the government, and he or the president or vice president led government sessions. State affairs were managed by the Government's Presidency or certain ministries.

After the war, Pavelić established the Croatian State Committee with Lovro Sušić, Mate Frković, and Božidar Kavran as its leaders. In 1951, Pavelić filled Croatian State Government since some of earlier government members were arrested and executed. His new government acted as the government in exile. Džafer-beg Kulenović was named Minister-President.

Government composition

Government in exile
The government in exile was announced by Ante Pavelić on 10 April 1951.

Notes

References

Citations

General sources 
 
 
 

Independent State of Croatia
1941 establishments in Croatia
1945 disestablishments in Croatia
Cabinets established in 1941
Cabinets disestablished in 1945